Saint Mary's Catholic Church Complex is a historic Roman Catholic parish church located within the Archdiocese of Newark at Liberty and W. 6th Streets in Plainfield, Union County, New Jersey, United States.

History
It was built in 1871 and added to the National Register in 1985.

See also
National Register of Historic Places listings in Union County, New Jersey

References

External links

St. Mary's Church, Plainfield, New Jersey (New Jersey Churchscape)
St. Mary's Church, Plainfield, New Jersey (New Jersey Historic Trust)

Roman Catholic churches in New Jersey
Churches on the National Register of Historic Places in New Jersey
Gothic Revival church buildings in New Jersey
Roman Catholic churches completed in 1871
19th-century Roman Catholic church buildings in the United States
Churches in Union County, New Jersey
National Register of Historic Places in Union County, New Jersey
New Jersey Register of Historic Places
Plainfield, New Jersey